Thelma Parr (born Thelma Sill, October 19, 1906 – February 13, 2000) was an American actress. She is best remembered for her roles in Mack Sennett comedies as one of the Sennett Bathing Beauties, appearing in numerous films for Mack Sennett. Parr, reportedly a descendant of Thomas Paine, was considered by film critics to be one of the most beautiful brunettes in Hollywood films.

Life and career
She was married to banjo player, William E. Goman, in Santa Ana, California on May 21, 1925. Parr obtained a divorce decree from Goman in April 1930. Parr's film career was ended by a car accident in which she received facial injuries in March 1928 on Sunset Boulevard. Her mouth was badly mutilated when she was thrown against a windshield of an auto in which she was a passenger; Parr received a compensatory sum of $7,112 from the driver of the vehicle, Kenneth Sanderson.

Death
Thelma Parr died in San Clemente, California in 2000, aged 93.

Filmography

References

Sources

External links

 

American film actresses
American silent film actresses
Actresses from Grants Pass, Oregon
1906 births
2000 deaths
20th-century American actresses